Campeonato Acreano (sometimes referred as Campeonato Acriano) is the football league of the State of Acre, Brazil. It is organized by the Acre State Football Federation.

Format

2020 First Division
First stage
The 10 clubs are divided into two groups, in which teams from one group play against all teams of the other group.
Last two teams are eliminated from the competition with the last one relegated to the second division, while the two best of each group qualify to the semifinal.
In the semifinal, the best-placed team of each group face the second-best-placed of their own group in a single match. The two teams which qualify to the final, also played in a single match.

Second stage
The remaining eight teams are divided into two groups, facing the other teams of their own group.
The two best teams of each group qualify to the semifinal, where the best-placed team of each group face the second-best-placed of the opposing group in a single match. The two teams which qualify to the final, also played in a single match.

Third stage (if necessary)
Home-and-away playoff with the winners of the first and second stages.

If a team wins both stages (first and second) it is crowned the state champion. If not, the third stage is disputed, and the winner is the state champion.

Clubs

2021 First Division

Andirá Esporte Clube
Atlético Acreano
Galvez Esporte Clube
Sport Clube Humaitá 
Náuas Esporte Clube
Plácido de Castro Futebol Club
Rio Branco Football Club
São Francisco Futebol Clube
Associação Desportiva Vasco da Gama

List of champions

Amateur era

Liga Acreana de Esportes Terrestres

Federação Acreana de Desportos

Professional era

Federação de Futebol do Estado do Acre

Federação de Futebol do Acre

Titles by team

Teams in bold stills active.

By city

References

External links
 Campeonato Acreano at RSSSF

 
State football leagues in Brazil